Ignacio Nicolini (born 30 September 1988) is a Uruguayan footballer who plays as [midfielder]] for Bella Vista.

References

1988 births
Living people
Uruguayan footballers
Uruguayan expatriate footballers
Association football midfielders
C.A. Bella Vista players
Peñarol players
Cerro Largo F.C. players
Racing Club de Montevideo players
Flamurtari Vlorë players
S.S. Monopoli 1966 players
Uruguayan Primera División players
Kategoria Superiore players
Expatriate footballers in Albania
Expatriate footballers in Italy